Naja Rosa Koppel (born 1980) is a Danish singer-songwriter. She is the daughter of Savage Rose founders Annisette and Thomas Koppel and raised in Denmark and USA. She debuted on 16 August 2010 with her album Naja Rosa, which she released to favourable reviews by critics. She is regarded as the renewer of the tradition of Savage Rose. Koppel's first solo concert in Denmark was held at the "Spotfestival" in Aarhus in 2010, for which she was awarded 6 stars by Danish music magazine Gaffa.

Discography

Albums

Singles

References

External links 

Danish women singer-songwriters
Living people
1980 births
21st-century Danish women  singers